Canal Nou Dos was the second channel launched by Radiotelevisió Valenciana on 9 October 1997.

The channel was launched under the name Notícies 9, a channel dedicated to informative programmes made by RTVV. It changed its name to Punt 2 after it began to show informative, documentary and cultural, as well as sport programmes during the weekend. All programmes are in Valencian, unlike sister channel Canal Nou, which broadcasts in both Valencian and Spanish. In 2010 the channel was re-branded under its current name, Canal Nou Dos.

External links
 

2013 disestablishments in the Valencian Community
Catalan-language television stations
Defunct television channels in Spain
Radiotelevisió Valenciana
Television channels and stations established in 1997
Television channels and stations disestablished in 2013
Mass media in the Valencian Community